Bill Ivy (born 1953 in Toronto, Ontario) is a veteran photographer and author on natural history, with 24 books to his credit including the award-winning A Little Wilderness: The Natural History of Toronto.

In the mid-1960s, he was a student at the International School Ibadan in Nigeria during the Nigerian Civil War.

Ivy is a lecturer on photography and natural history, and a popular nature guide. He has appeared on numerous radio and TV programs. He was still photographer for the BBC on Sir David Attenborough's Wildlife on One: Backyard Bandits. His work has been featured in hundreds of publications in North America and abroad.

He currently resides in Toronto, Ontario.

Selected books 

 A Little Wilderness - The Natural History of Toronto
 Close to Home - A Canadian Country Diary
 Wildlife of America
 Wilderness Canada
 Getting to Know Nature's Children series
 Our Wildlife World series

References

External links 
 Bill Ivy's official site (http://www.billivy.com)

1953 births
Artists from Toronto
Canadian photographers
Canadian children's writers
Canadian nature writers
International School, Ibadan alumni
Living people
Writers from Toronto
Canadian expatriates in Nigeria